Ralitsa (also written Ralitza, Ralica; or Ралица in Cyrillic) may refer to:

People
 Ralitsa Vassileva, Bulgarian journalist

Places
 In Bulgaria:
 Ralitsa, Kardzhali Province - a village in Momchilgrad municipality, Kardzhali Province
 Ralitsa, Targovishte Province - a village in Targovishte municipality, Targovishte Province